Antareen (The Confined) is a 1993 Indian film in Bengali language, directed by Mrinal Sen, based on a story named Badshahat Ka Khatimah (1950) by Saadat Hasan Manto (but with a different ending in the screenplay). It stars Anjan Dutt and Dimple Kapadia.
Antareen was the first non-Hindi project Kapadia took part in since Vikram (1986). She played a woman caught in a loveless marriage. Insisting on playing her part spontaneously, Kapadia refused to enroll in a crash-course in Bengali as she wrongly felt that she would be able to speak it convincingly. Her voice was eventually dubbed by actor Anushua Chatterjee, something Kapadia was unhappy with.

At the 1993 National Film Award, it was awarded the National Film Award for Best Feature Film in Bengali.

Synopsis
A young writer (Anjan Dutta), seeking inspiration, is living alone in a friend's old mansion in Calcutta. One night he starts talking to a stranger (Dimple Kapadia) over the phone. The conversation soon develops into a relationship as details of their lives are revealed. They chance met on a train, when Dimple was able to recognize him from his voice and way of talking, just as she reboarded the train at a way side station.

Cast
Anjan Dutt as The Writer
 Dimple Kapadia as The Woman
 Tathagata Sanyal

References

External links
 

1993 films
Bengali-language Indian films
Films based on short fiction
Films set in Kolkata
Best Bengali Feature Film National Film Award winners
1990s Bengali-language films
National Film Development Corporation of India films
Saadat Hasan Manto